Gendt is a small city with city rights in the Netherlands, in the province of Gelderland. The town is located in the Betuwe region, and is part of the municipality of Lingewaard. Gendt is situated along the rivers Waal and Linge. It has a population of 7,230 (as of 1 January 2020).

History
In 1233 Gendt received city rights from Otto II, Count of Guelders. At the time, the town was known for its castles: Poelwijk Castle and Hof Gendt. Gendt was previously an independent municipality, but merged with Huissen and Bemmel in 2001, to form Lingewaard.

Annual festivals
Notable annual festivals in Gendt include:
 Cherry Festival of Gendt (Dutch: Gendste Kersenfeest), an annual festival in Gendt, at the end of June (since 1938)
 Gendt funfair (Dutch: Gendste kermis), an annual festival in Gendt, at the weekend before the last Tuesday of August

Notable residents
Notable people who were born, have lived, or are living in Gendt include: 
 Stijn Schaars (born 1984), a Dutch former football player with over 300 club caps
 Mirjam Melchers (born 1975), a Dutch former racing cyclist

Twinned towns
Gendt is twinned with:
  Kalkar (Germany)

Photo gallery

References

External links

 Groeten uit Gendt Local news website of Gendt

Cities in the Netherlands
Municipalities of the Netherlands disestablished in 2001
Populated places in Gelderland
Former municipalities of Gelderland
Lingewaard